Steinkjer-Avisa is a weekly, local newspaper published in Steinkjer, Norway. In 2007, it had a circulation of 3,917, and was published each Friday.

The newspaper was founded in 1984 by Lothar Viem. In 1999, the Viem family sold to the other Steinkjer newspaper, Trønder-Avisa, but retains its own editor, offices, employees and board of directors.

References

Weekly newspapers published in Norway
Publications established in 1984
Companies based in Steinkjer
Mass media in Trøndelag
1984 establishments in Norway